Jordan Baker may refer to:

 Jordan Baker (The Great Gatsby), a character in the 1925 novel The Great Gatsby by F. Scott Fitzgerald
 Jordan Baker (umpire) (born 1981), American umpire in Major League Baseball
 Jordan Baker (soccer) (born 1996), Australian soccer player
 Jordan Baker, American actor in Edward Albee's 1994 play Three Tall Women